"Madame" Marie Aioe Dorion Venier Toupin (ca. 1786 – September 5, 1850) was the only female member of an overland expedition sent by Pacific Fur Company to the Pacific Northwest in 1810. Like her first husband, Pierre Dorion Jr., she was Métis. Her mother was of the Iowa people and her father was French Canadian. She was also known as Marie Laguivoise, a name recorded in 1841 at the Willamette Mission and apparently a variation on Aiaouez, later rendered as Iowa.

Missouri
It is likely that Dorion and Sacajawea knew one another. Peter Stark notes the similarities between the two women in his book Astoria: both women were originally based in the then-small settlement of St. Louis, and they were both wives of interpreters in the burgeoning Missouri fur trade.

Pacific Northwest
Her first husband Pierre Dorion Jr. was hired by the Pacific Fur Company to join Wilson Price Hunt and a group on an overland expedition to Fort Astoria. Also present were their two young boys, who were probably two and four years old. Dorion gave birth to another child near what is now North Powder, Oregon, who died several days later. After reaching Fort Astoria, Dorion and her family returned with a trapping party to the Snake River area. While at a trading post in January 1814, Dorion learned from a scout that her husband and a small trapping party were about to be attacked by a band of Bannocks. After traveling three days alone with her two infant children, she found the scene of the attack. Only one of the trappers, LeClarc, was alive, and was moved away from the area on a horse. Despite Dorion's medical attention for LeClarc, he died that evening.

There were several horses left by the Bannock warriors and were promptly taken by Dorion back to the small fur trading post. However, upon reaching the post, she discovered the few staff had been killed and scalped. Attempting to reach another safe fur trading station in the Pacific Northwest, one of Dorion's two horses collapsed in the Blue Mountains. She supported her two infants for 50 days during winter. Dorion created snare traps out of the horse manes to provide a supply of mice and squirrels for her family. She additionally smoked the horseflesh, collected frozen berries, and later gathered the inner flesh of trees to prevent her family starving. Near the end of March, Dorion was able to progress west, eventually reaching a Walla Walla village, exhausted and short of food. The village leadership provided material support and aided her in getting back to Fort Astoria.

Dorion married twice more and had three more children. Her second husband was Louis Venier. With her third husband, Jean Toupin, she settled near Saint Louis, Oregon, on the French Prairie. It was here that she began to be known as "Madame" or "Madame Iowa". One of her two eldest sons, Jean Baptiste, joined the Oregon Rifles and fought in the Cayuse War.

Death and legacy

After Dorion Venier Toupin died on September 5, 1850, she was buried inside the original log Catholic church in Saint Louis. When the church burned down in 1880 and the current church built, the location of Dorion's grave was forgotten and remains unknown to this day. It was only when the church register was translated from French into English many years after the original church burned down that it was learned that Dorion had been buried there. There is no record of why she received this honor instead of being buried in the nearby cemetery, but church burial requires special dispensation and may have indicated that Dorion was especially devout.

Among the places memorializing Dorion are two parks: Madame Dorion Memorial Park at the mouth of the Walla Walla River near Wallula, Washington, and Marie Dorion Park, a Milton-Freewater, Oregon city park near the foothills of the Blue Mountains. The Dorion Complex residence hall at Eastern Oregon University is in La Grande. There is a plaque noting the place near North Powder where she likely gave birth. Hers is also one of the 158 names of people important to Oregon's history that are painted in the House and Senate chambers of the Oregon State Capitol. Her name is in the Senate chamber. St. Louis, Oregon, has a street named after her, Dorion Lane.

Oregon author Jane Kirkpatrick wrote the Tender Ties trilogy of historical novels based on Dorion's life. The individual titles in the series are A Name of Her Own, Every Fixed Star, and Hold Tight the Thread.

On May 10, 2014, the Daughters of the American Revolution held a service at Saint Louis Catholic Church dedicating a historical marker in Dorion's honor.

See also
Books and journalists that mention Dorion's survival story:
Astoria, by Washington Irving
Gabriel Franchère
Alexander Ross
Red Heroines of the Northwest, by Byron Defenbach, First Printing, August 1929, Caxton Printers, LTD, Caldwell, Idaho

Further reading
Boyer, P. S., James, J. W., James, E. T. (1971). Notable American Women, 1607-1950: A Biographical Dictionary. United Kingdom: Belknap Press of Harvard University Press.
Elliott, T. C. (1935). "The Grave of Madame Dorion". Oregon Historical Quarterly, 36(1), 102–104. 
Kirkpatrick, J. (2002). A Name of Her Own. United States: WaterBrook Press.

References

Works cited

External links

"Marie's Descendents" from the Brooks Historical Society Newsletter April 2011
Biography of Jean Baptiste Dorion from Oregon Pioneers

1780s births
1850 deaths
19th-century Native Americans
Burials in Oregon
Indigenous people of the Pacific Northwest
Iowa people
American Métis people
People from Marion County, Oregon
Year of birth uncertain